Batrachyla taeniata is a species of frog in the family Batrachylidae.
It is found in Argentina and Chile.
Its natural habitats are subantarctic forest, temperate forest, temperate shrubland, subantarctic grassland, temperate grassland, swampland, intermittent freshwater marshes, rocky shores, pastureland, rural gardens, and introduced vegetation.
It is threatened by habitat loss.

References

Batrachyla
Amphibians of Argentina
Amphibians of Chile
Taxonomy articles created by Polbot
Amphibians described in 1854